Chrysopa oculata is a species of green lacewing in the family Chrysopidae. It is found in North America and Central America. This species was imported to New Zealand in 1926, as a way to control aphid populations, however did not establish in the country.

References

Further reading

External links

 

Chrysopidae
Articles created by Qbugbot
Insects described in 1839
Insects of Australia